Emily Alyn Lind (born 2001/2002) is an American actress. She began her career as a child actress, when she was known for her recurring role as young Amanda Clarke on the ABC series Revenge, and for her role as Ariel on the CBS medical drama Code Black. Lind has also starred in the Netflix original films The Babysitter and The Babysitter: Killer Queen as Melanie, and in the theatrical film Doctor Sleep as Snakebite Andi. Since 2021, she has starred as Audrey Hope in the HBO Max teen drama series Gossip Girl.

Personal life
Lind is the daughter of producer John Lind and actress Barbara Alyn Woods. She has an older sister, Natalie Alyn Lind, and a younger sister, Alyvia Alyn Lind, who are also actresses.

Career

Lind made her film debut as a child actress in 2008 in The Secret Life of Bees. Since then she has appeared in such films as Dear Dumb Diary, Enter the Void, J. Edgar, The Haunting in Connecticut 2: Ghosts of Georgia, and Movie 43. She has played Emma Lavery in the soap opera All My Children.

Lind has had recurring roles in the ABC television series Revenge as young Amanda Clarke, as well as in the ABC television series Eastwick as Emily Gardener. She has also appeared in such series as Days of Our Lives, Medium, Flashpoint, Criminal Minds, Suburgatory, and Hawaii Five-0. In 2017, Lind was promoted to a starring role on the CBS medical drama Code Black for the series' third season, after appearing as the character of Ariel during the show's first two seasons.

Lind starred as Melanie in the comedy horror film, The Babysitter, which was released on Netflix in 2017. She reprised her role in the sequel, The Babysitter: Killer Queen. In 2018, Lind was cast as Snakebite Andi in the 2019 film Doctor Sleep, based on the Stephen King novel and sequel to The Shining.

In March 2020, it was announced that Lind is set to star in the HBO Max teen drama Gossip Girl, which debuted in 2021.

Filmography

Film

Television

Awards and nominations

References

External links

 
 

American child actresses
American film actresses
American television actresses
2000s births
American voice actresses
Living people
Place of birth missing (living people)
21st-century American actresses
Year of birth uncertain